Karin Slaughter (born January 6, 1971) is an American crime writer. She has written 21 novels, which have sold more than 40 million copies and have been published in 120 countries. Her first novel, Blindsighted (2001), was published in 27 languages and made the Crime Writers' Association's Dagger Award shortlist for "Best Thriller Debut" of 2001.

Slaughter also won the 2015 CWA Ian Fleming Steel Dagger award for her novel Cop Town.

Her 2018 novel, Pieces of Her, was adapted into an eight-episode television series of the same name, released in March 2022 on Netflix.

Philanthropy
Slaughter is a library advocate and founded Save the Libraries, a non-profit organization that campaigns to support US public libraries. The Save the Libraries fund has provided more than $300,000 to the DeKalb County Public Library in Atlanta, Georgia.

Publishing history

Characters from Slaughter's two main series, Grant County and Will Trent (Atlanta), were brought together in her novels Undone (2009), titled Genesis internationally, and Broken (2010). In these novels, Will Trent and Sara Linton work cases set in Atlanta and Grant County, respectively.

Grant County series (2001 to 2007)

Slaughter is best known for her Grant County series:
 Blindsighted, 2001
 Kisscut, 2002
 A Faint Cold Fear, 2003
 Indelible, 2004
 Faithless, 2005
 Beyond Reach/Skin Privilege, 2007

Set in the fictional town of Heartsdale, Georgia, (in the fictional Grant County) the narrative takes place from the perspective of three main characters: Sara Linton, the town's pediatrician and part-time coroner; Jeffrey Tolliver, Linton's husband and the chief of police; and his subordinate, detective Lena Adams.

Will Trent (Atlanta) series

The Will Trent series, which takes place in Atlanta, Georgia, features Georgia Bureau of Investigation special agent Will Trent and his partner Faith Mitchell. So far, Trent has appeared in Triptych, Fractured, Undone, Broken, Fallen, Criminal, Unseen, The Kept Woman, The Last Widow and The Silent Wife, as well as the novellas Snatched and Busted.

ABC has ordered a pilot starring Ramón Rodríguez as Trent and Erika Christensen as Angie, his girlfriend.  The series has started playing as of Jan 3, 2023.

Other works

Like a Charm is a short story anthology featuring several thriller authors, including Lee Child, Peter Robinson (novelist), John Connolly (author), and Laura Lippman. Each story is linked by a charm bracelet that brings bad luck to its owners. The setting and time periods of each story vary greatly, ranging from 19th-century Georgia to wartime Leeds. Karin Slaughter wrote the first and last stories.

Martin Misunderstood is an original audio novella narrated by Wayne Knight. Both the story and the narration were nominated for an Audie Award in 2009.

The Unremarkable Heart won the Edgar Award for Best Short Story in 2013.

Her book Pieces of Her reached number 2 on the New York Times Bestseller list, the week it was released in late August 2018. Pieces of Her was published through HarperCollins and follows a young woman who learns about a hidden side of her mother, Laura. It is in the vein of a psychological thriller and was given a positive review by Publishers Weekly and Kirkus Reviews. Her other standalone novels—Cop Town, Pretty Girls, The Good Daughter, and False Witness—have all been New York Times bestsellers.

In February 2019, it was announced that Netflix will be developing an 8-episode television series starring Toni Collette, based on the Pieces of Her novel.

Personal life
Slaughter was a contestant on an installment of ABC's Holey Moley which originally aired on June 4, 2020.

Bibliography

The Grant County series

Blindsighted (2001)
Kisscut (2002)
A Faint Cold Fear (2003)
Indelible (2004)
Faithless, (2005)
Beyond Reach (2007), Skin Privilege (UK title)

The Will Trent series

Triptych (2006)
Fractured (2008)
Undone (2009), Genesis (UK/Australia title)
Broken (2010)
Fallen (2011)
Snatched (2012, ebook novella)
Criminal (2012)
Busted (2013, ebook novella)
Unseen (2013)
The Kept Woman (2016)
The Last Widow (2019)
The Silent Wife (2020)
After That Night (August 2023)

Other books

Like A Charm (2004; editor)
Martin Misunderstood (2008)
Thorn in My Side (2011; ebook novella)
Cop Town (2014)
 Blonde Hair, Blue Eyes (2015) (novella) (prequel to Pretty Girls)
 Pretty Girls (2015)
 Last Breath (2017) (novella) (prequel to The Good Daughter)
 The Good Daughter (2017)
 Pieces of Her (2018)
 False Witness (2021)
 Girl, Forgotten (2022)

Awards 
Slaughter has won or been nominated for many awards.

2020 

 Ned Kelly Award

2019 

 Georgia Author of the Year
 ITW Thriller Award Finalist

2017 

 The Skimm Book Club
 Romantic Times Lifetime Achievement Award Winner, Suspense
 AudioFile Best Book of the Year (AudioFile Earphones Award)
 Ian Fleming Steel Dagger Award Longlist

2016 

 ITW Thriller Award Finalist
 People’s Choice Award Winner

2015 

 Edgar Nomination, Best Novel, Cop Town
 American Association of People with Disabilities Image Award
 CWA Ian Fleming Steel Dagger Award, Winner, Cop Town

2014 

 Romantic Times Reviewers Choice Award
 AudioFile Magazine Earphones Award Winner, Cop Town, 2013
 Crime Zone, The Silver Fingerprint Winner, Best Foreign Thriller, Unseen
 Bouchercon Anthony Nomination, Best Short Story, The Unremarkable Heart
 Edgar Award Winner, Best Short Story

2013 

 Mystery Readers International Macavity award nomination, Best Short Story, The Unremarkable Heart

2011 

 Crime Zone, The Silver Fingerprint Winner, Best Foreign Thriller, Fallen
 International Thriller Writers Silver Bullet Award Winner

2010 

 Suspense Magazine Best of 2010 Winner, Thriller/Suspense, Broken

2009 

 Le Livre de Poche Prix Lecteurs Winner, Faithless
 Crime Zone the Silver Fingerprint Winner, Best Foreign Thriller, Fractured
 Audio Publishers association Audie Nomination, Humor, Martin Misunderstood
 Left Coast Crime Hawaii Five-0 Nomination, Best Law Enforcement/Police Procedural, Fractured

2008 

 ITV Crime Thriller International Author of the Year Nomination, Best Fiction, Beyond Reach
 Georgia Author of the Year Nomination, Best Fiction, Beyond Reach

2007 

 Crime Zone the Silver Fingerprint Winner, Best Foreign Thriller, Beyond Reach
 Crime Writers’ Ian Fleming Steel Dagger nomination, Best Thriller, Triptych

2003 

 Romantic Times Reviewers’ Choice Awards Winner, Best Contemporary Mystery, A Faint Cold

2002 

 Mystery Readers International Macavity Award Nomination, Best First Mystery, Blindsighted
 International Thriller Writers Barry Award Nomination, Best First Novel, Blindsighted

2001 

 Crime Writers Association Dagger Award Nomination, Best Thriller Debut, Blindsighted

References

External links
 Karin Slaughter website
 Interview with Karin Slaughter at www.LiteraryWeek.com
 Karin Slaughter at Bookreporter.com
 Interview with Karin Slaughter at www.TheCrimeHouse.com
 Save the Libraries
 Roger Nichols of Modern Signed Books interviews Karin Slaughter about her novel, The Kept Woman
 BlogTalkRadio interview about her novel, The Good Daughter

21st-century American novelists
American women novelists
American thriller writers
Living people
Writers from Atlanta
American LGBT novelists
21st-century American women writers
Women mystery writers
LGBT people from Georgia (U.S. state)
Women thriller writers
Novelists from Georgia (U.S. state)
1971 births